Elseya caelatus is a species of Australasian snapping turtle that is endemic to New Guinea. The specific epithet caelatus (“carved”) refers to the strongly sculpted texture of the carapace.

Subspecies
 E. c. caelatus Joseph-Ouni & McCord, 2019
 E. c. ayamaru Joseph-Ouni & McCord, 2019

Distribution
The species occurs in Western New Guinea, including the Bird's Head Peninsula as well as the nearby islands of Salawati and Waigeo. The type locality for the nominate subspecies is Salawati; that for E. c. ayamaru is the Ayamaru Lakes.

References

 
caelatus
Turtles of New Guinea
Reptiles of Western New Guinea
Reptiles described in 2019